Francisco Balagtas (1788–1862) was a Filipino national poet. 

Balagtas may also refer to:

Balagtas, Bulacan
Balagtas (crater)
Irving Reef (or Balagtas Reef), a coral reef in the Spratly Islands
Balagtasan, an art form

People with the surname
Jose Balagtas
Maricar Balagtas